Radical 183 or radical fly meaning "fly" is one of the 11 Kangxi radicals out of 214 composed of 9 strokes.

In the Kangxi Dictionary, there are 92 characters (out of 49,030) to be found under this radical.

Evolution

Derived characters

Literature

External links

Unihan Database - U+98DB

183
057